Marguerite of France may refer to:

 Margaret of France, Queen of England and Hungary (1158 – 1197), queen consort of England and Hungary
 Margaret of Provence (1221–1295), queen of France as the wife of Louis IX of France
 Margaret of France (1254–1271), daughter of Louis IX of France, wife of John I, Duke of Brabant
 Margaret of France, Queen of England (1279 – 1318), queen consort of England, wife of Edward I of England
 Margaret of France (1288–1294), daughter of Philip IV of France
 Margaret I, Countess of Artois (1310–82), countess of Flanders, Artois and Burgundy, wife of Louis I of Flanders and mother of Louis II of Flanders
 Margaret of France (1347–1352), daughter of John II of France and Bonne of Bohemia
 Marguerite, bâtarde de France (1407–58), illegitimate daughter of Charles VI of France, married Jean de Belleville et de Montaigu
 Marguerite de Navarre (1492–1549 also called Margaret of Angoulême), elder sister of Francis I of France, married Henry II of Navarre
 Margaret of France, Duchess of Berry (Valois) (1523–74), daughter of Francis I of France and Claude of France, wife of Emmanuel Philibert, Duke of Savoy
 Margaret of Valois (1553–1615), daughter of Henry II of France, wife of Henry IV of France